The Men's marathon T11 was a marathon event in athletics at the 2004 Summer Paralympics in Athens, for totally blind athletes (running with a sighted guide). Defending champion and world record holder Carlos Amaral Ferreira of Portugal took part, along with sixteen other athletes, from a total of ten countries. No athlete had ever successfully defended his title in the men's fully blind marathon, and Ferreira failed to become the first; he took silver, finishing half a minute behind Japan's Yuichi Takahashi.

The 2004 men's T11 marathon is the most recent to have been held as a distinct event. At the 2008 Paralympics, it was abolished, and athletes categorised T11 (totally blind) were invited to run in the T12 marathon for athletes with severe visual impairment.

Results

T13

The T13 event, held at the same time as the T11, was won by Ildar Pomykalov, representing .

Results

See also
 Marathon at the Paralympics

References 

M
2004 marathons
Marathons at the Paralympics
Men's marathons